The brown-capped fantail (Rhipidura diluta) is a species of bird in the family Rhipiduridae.
It is found in the Lesser Sunda Islands (Sumbawa and Flores).

Its natural habitats are subtropical or tropical moist lowland forests and subtropical or tropical moist montane forests.

References

brown-capped fantail
Birds of the Lesser Sunda Islands
Birds of Flores
brown-capped fantail
Taxonomy articles created by Polbot